Desmopachria is a genus of beetles in the family Dytiscidae, containing the following species:

 Desmopachria aldessa Young, 1980
 Desmopachria amyae K.B.Miller, 2001
 Desmopachria annae K.B.Miller, 2005
 Desmopachria aphronoscelus K.B.Miller, 1999
 Desmopachria aspera Young, 1981
 Desmopachria attenuata Régimbart, 1895
 Desmopachria aurea Young, 1980
 Desmopachria balfourbrownei Young, 1990
 Desmopachria balionota K.B.Miller, 2005
 Desmopachria barackobamai 2015
 Desmopachria basicollis Guignot, 1950
 Desmopachria bifasciata Zimmermann, 1921
 Desmopachria bolivari K.B.Miller, 1999
 Desmopachria brevicollis Régimbart, 1903
 Desmopachria bryanstonii (Clark, 1862)
 Desmopachria cenchramis Young, 1981
 Desmopachria challeti K.B.Miller, 2001
 Desmopachria chei K.B.Miller, 1999
 Desmopachria circularis Sharp, 1882
 Desmopachria concolor Sharp, 1882
 Desmopachria convexa (Aubé, 1838)
 Desmopachria darlingtoni Young, 1989
 Desmopachria decorosa Young, 1995
 Desmopachria defloccata Young, 1981
 Desmopachria dispar Sharp, 1882
 Desmopachria dispersa (Crotch, 1873)
 Desmopachria draco K.B.Miller, 1999
 Desmopachria ferrugata Régimbart, 1895
 Desmopachria flavida Young, 1981
 Desmopachria fossulata Zimmermann, 1928
 Desmopachria geijskesi Young, 1990
 Desmopachria glabella Young, 1981
 Desmopachria glabricula Sharp, 1882
 Desmopachria goias Young, 1995
 Desmopachria granoides Young, 1986
 Desmopachria granum (LeConte, 1855)
 Desmopachria grouvellei Régimbart, 1895
 Desmopachria hylobates Young, 1993
 Desmopachria iridis Young, 1980
 Desmopachria isthmia Young, 1981
 Desmopachria laesslei Young, 1981
 Desmopachria laevis Sharp, 1882
 Desmopachria latissima (LeConte, 1852)
 Desmopachria leechi Young, 1981
 Desmopachria lewisi Young, 1981
 Desmopachria liosomata Young, 1986
 Desmopachria majuscula Young, 1990
 Desmopachria margarita Young, 1990
 Desmopachria mendozana (Steinheil, 1869)
 Desmopachria mexicana Sharp, 1882
 Desmopachria minuta Young, 1980
 Desmopachria mutata Sharp, 1882
 Desmopachria mutchleri Blatchley, 1919
 Desmopachria nigra Zimmermann, 1923
 Desmopachria nitida Babington, 1841
 Desmopachria nitidissima Zimmermann, 1928
 Desmopachria nitidoides Young, 1990
 Desmopachria novacula Young, 1980
 Desmopachria ovalis Sharp, 1882
 Desmopachria paradoxa Zimmermann, 1923
 Desmopachria phacoides Guignot, 1950
 Desmopachria pilosa K.B.Miller, 2005
 Desmopachria pittieri Young, 1995
 Desmopachria portmanni (Clark, 1862)
 Desmopachria psarammo K.B.Miller, 1999
 Desmopachria pulvis Guignot, 1958
 Desmopachria punctatissima Zimmermann, 1923
 Desmopachria rhea K.B.Miller, 1999
 Desmopachria ruginosa Young, 1990
 Desmopachria sanfilippoi Guignot, 1957
 Desmopachria seminola Young, 1951
 Desmopachria signata Zimmermann, 1921
 Desmopachria signatoides K.B.Miller, 2001
 Desmopachria siolii Young, 1980
 Desmopachria sobrina Young, 1995
 Desmopachria speculum Sharp, 1887
 Desmopachria striga Young, 1990
 Desmopachria strigata Young, 1981
 Desmopachria striola Sharp, 1887
 Desmopachria subfasciata Young, 1990
 Desmopachria subnotata Zimmermann, 1921
 Desmopachria subtilis Sharp, 1882
 Desmopachria suturalis Sharp, 1882
 Desmopachria tambopatensis K.B.Miller, 2005
 Desmopachria taniae K.B.Miller, 1999
 Desmopachria tarda Spangler, 1973
 Desmopachria ubangoides Young, 1980
 Desmopachria varians Wehncke, 1877
 Desmopachria variegata Sharp, 1882
 Desmopachria vicina Sharp, 1887
 Desmopachria volatidisca K.B.Miller, 2001
 Desmopachria volvata Young, 1981
 Desmopachria youngi K.B.Miller, 1999
 Desmopachria zelota Young, 1990
 Desmopachria zethus Young, 1995
 Desmopachria zimmermani Young, 1981

References

Dytiscidae